Torre Beretti e Castellaro is a comune (municipality) in the Province of Pavia in the Italian region Lombardy, located about 60 km southwest of Milan and about 40 km southwest of Pavia. As of 31 December 2004, it had a population of 604 and an area of 17.5 km².

Torre Beretti e Castellaro borders the following municipalities: Bozzole, Frascarolo, Mede, Sartirana Lomellina, Valenza.

Demographic evolution

References

Cities and towns in Lombardy